Divi Divi Air N.V. is a small regional service airline in Curaçao established in 2001, and is colloquially known as "Divi". The airline was named after the Divi-divi trees which grow in the region.

History 

Divi Divi Air was founded on July 28th, 2000 and commenced operations in 2001 with a fleet of Britten-Norman BN-2P Islanders to Bonaire. For over 20 years, Divi Divi Air has been flying a passenger route between Curaçao and Bonaire. Aruba was added as a destination by the airline in February 2018. According to director Germaine Richie-Durand, the intention is to improve the connection between Bonaire and Aruba. "Divi wants to bring the population of the three islands closer together," says Richie-Durand. According to the Divi director, the Twin Otter will gradually be deployed more broadly on the routes between islands.

Divi Divi Air began flights out of Curaçao to Aruba on February 15, 2018. This was followed by the launch of operations to Aruba out of Bonaire on February 17, 2018. The expansion signals that Divi Divi Air has joined Aruba Airlines and, formerly, Insel Air as the only known airlines connecting the Dutch Caribbean's ABC islands. 

The Curaçaoan airline operates the Curaçao-Aruba service at least two times daily, the Curaçao-Bonaire service approximately ten times daily, while the flights out of Bonaire to Aruba are scheduled as one time weekly. All flights are operated by Twin Otter and the Britten-Norman Islander, as Divi Divi Air strives to be an efficient and reliable airline for all the travel needs of people traveling between Aruba, Bonaire and Curaçao.

In October 2018, it was announced that Divi Divi Air, in collaboration with Corendon Dutch Airlines and the Curaçao Tourism Board, would commence flights to Sint Maarten and Brazil for the winter season. Corendon will station a Boeing 737-800 in Curaçao as part of a plan to make some of its fleet available for charter flights or on behalf of third parties during the quieter winter season in Europe. The aircraft was also to be used to execute flights to Aruba.

In April of 2020, it was announced that Divi Divi Air welcomed its third Britten-Norman BN-2P Islanders into the family. Also, a special 'Iguana Divi' livery was unveiled. This special livery is painted on their new Twin Otter.

Destinations

Fleet

Current fleet
As of June 2021, the Divi Divi Air passenger fleet consists of the following aircraft: 

As of April 2020, the Divi Divi Air private fleet consists of the following aircraft:

Former fleet
Over the years, Divi Divi Air has operated the following aircraft types:

Accidents 

On October 22, 2009, a Britten-Norman BN-2A Islander operating as Divi Divi Air Flight 014 suffered an engine failure and ditched into the ocean five minutes away from Bonaire. The pilot was knocked unconscious on impact; passengers could not undo his safety harness and the pilot went down with the aircraft. Rescue vessels picked up all nine passengers.

References

External links 
 

Airlines of Curaçao
Airlines of the Netherlands Antilles
Airlines established in 2001
2001 establishments in the Netherlands Antilles